Paul Harris, born in 1950 in Melbourne and educated at Assumption College, Kilmore, is a film critic, who appears on radio stations 3RRR and 3AW. Known for his vast knowledge of film, music and theatre, and for his elaborate puns and impressions, he has fronted the radio show Filmbuff's Forecast since 1982. For the first ten years he co-anchored with John Flaus to produce what became a memorable double act. He has directed the St Kilda Short Film Festival since 1999.

He has occasionally acted (Nirvana Street murder, Love and Other Catastrophes) and is a lecturer in the Film and TV course at Swinburne University and also, a lecturer for the Professional Screenwriting course at RMIT.

He is the author of  The Film Buff's DVD Companion (Text Publishing).

External links

Filmbuff's Forecast website

Australian film critics
Living people
Year of birth missing (living people)